Zinowiewia micrantha is a species of plant in the family Celastraceae. It is endemic to Panama.

References

 C L Lundell, Studies of American Plants--XX, Phytologia 48: 131-136 (1981)

Flora of Panama
micrantha
Data deficient plants
Taxonomy articles created by Polbot